Alfred Josiah Edward Wood (30 June 1876 – 5 April 1919) was an English footballer who played in the Football League for Aston Villa, Burslem Port Vale, Derby County and Stoke. He helped Villa to finish second in the First Division in 1902–03, and helped Stoke to reach the FA Cup semi-finals in 1899.

Career
Wood played for local side Smallthorne Albion, before joining Burslem Port Vale in December 1892, aged 16. He made seven Second Division appearances in the 1892–93 season, claiming two goals in a 4–0 win over Northwich Victoria at the Athletic Ground on 4 March. He was an ever-present for the Vale in the 32 game 1893–94 season, and scored 12 goals in 28 league games. He scored four goals in 28 league games in the 1894–95 campaign. A versatile player, he was utilised in most positions during his time at the club; including in goal at Rotherham Town on 28 October 1893, where he actually kept a clean sheet in a 1–0 win.

However, he signed for Southampton St Mary's in the summer of 1895. Port Vale lodged a complaint with The Football Association about "poaching", claiming that the contract was signed before the League season had ended. An emergency FA meeting was held at Sheffield, resulting in the "Saints" being severely censured for negligence. St Mary's were ordered to pay their own costs, plus £1 13s to Port Vale. The Southampton director, Alfred McMinn was suspended for a year and trainer Bill Dawson for a month; Wood's registration with St Mary's was cancelled. Wood never played for Port Vale again either, and instead returned to the Potteries and signed for Stoke in October 1895. He made an instant impact, scoring on his debut against Derby County at the Baseball Ground. He slowly established himself in Horace Austerberry's squad and was involved in controversial scenes at the end of the 1897–98 season. Stoke had a poor campaign and finished bottom of the First Division, meaning they had to play a test match series against Newcastle United and Burnley. In the final match against Burnley, both teams went into the match knowing that a draw would see them remain in the First Division and throughout the 90 minutes not a single attempt on goal was made, this led to the introduction of automatic promotion and relegation. The following season saw an improvement, as Stoke reached the semi-final of the FA Cup for the first time, losing out 3–1 to Derby County. Wood spent two more seasons at the Victoria Ground, before joining Aston Villa in March 1901.

Wood became a regular at Villa Park for the next three seasons, and almost won a league championship medal in 1902–03 as Villa finished as runner-up to The Wednesday. Wood left the "Villans" in May 1905, having scored seven goals in 111 league and cup games. He then played two seasons with Derby County, making 60 First Division appearances for the club. He later played for Bradford Park Avenue.

Career statistics
Source:

References

1876 births
1919 deaths
Footballers from Stoke-on-Trent
English footballers
Association football midfielders
Association football utility players
Port Vale F.C. players
Stoke City F.C. players
Aston Villa F.C. players
Derby County F.C. players
Bradford (Park Avenue) A.F.C. players
English Football League players